On New Year's Eve, many localities in the United States and elsewhere mark the beginning of a new year through the raising or lowering of an object. Many of these events are patterned on festivities that have been held at New York City's Times Square since 1908, where a large crystal ball is lowered down a pole atop One Times Square (beginning its descent at 11:59:00 p.m. local time, and concluding at midnight). In turn, the event was inspired by the time balls used by ship navigators in the 19th century to calibrate their chronometers.

Whilst some of these events use a ball in imitation of Times Square, many "drops" utilize objects that represent an aspect of local culture, geography, or history. Ball drops are by far the most common in, but not exclusive to, the United States.

List of drops or raises by time zone and location

Atlantic Time Zone

Bermuda
 St. George's, Bermuda: A paper-mache Bermuda onion covered in Christmas lights is dropped.

North American Eastern Time Zone

Kentucky
 Prestonsburg, Kentucky a star is raised.

Delaware
 Dewey Beach, Delaware: A skimboarder is dropped.

Florida
Note: The Florida Panhandle is in the Central Time Zone.

 Brooksville, Florida: A 90 kilogrammes (200-pound) tangerine was dropped 12 meters (40 feet) during the countdown to midnight until 2009. The tangerine drop was an emblem of the citrus industry that once thrived in Brooksville.
 Fort Lauderdale, Florida: As a symbol of the city's nickname The Venice of America, an anchor is dropped.
 Key West, Florida (Sloppy Joe's Bar): The Key West Conch Drop, where a six-foot Queen Conch Shell drops 6 meters (20 feet) to the top of the bar to usher in the New Year, is held annually for the island's official New Year celebrations.
 Key West, Florida (801 Saloon): The 801 Saloon, a local gay bar, drops a ruby slipper with drag queen Gary "Sushi" Marion inside each year.
 Miami, Florida: Miami is home of "The Big Orange" Drop. (Florida is the orange state) A 10 meters (35-foot) piece of flat neon signage, dubbed “Mr. Neon” and designed in the shape of an orange with sunglasses, rises 120 meters (400 feet) until it reaches the top of the Hotel Intercontinental Miami and is dropped from the top.
 In years when the Miami Heat play a home game on New Year's Eve, American Airlines Arena hosts a New Year's Eve basketball drop for those attending the game.
 Orlando, Florida: An orange is dropped. The Annual Church Street Entertainment New Year's Eve Street Party includes "a huge video wall, confetti cannons, fireworks, and the tradition of the Orange Drop high above Church Street".
 Sarasota, Florida: A glowing pineapple is dropped at midnight to ring in the new year in southwest Florida.
 Winter Haven, Florida (Legoland): A Lego brick is dropped at 8:00 p.m. Eastern Time.

Georgia

 Atlanta, Georgia: A peach is lowered as part of the annual Peach Drop, which had been held at Underground Atlanta from 1989 to 2017 and 2019. For 2018, the event moved to Woodruff Park. The 2020, 2021, and 2022 editions were cancelled due to event improvements and the COVID-19 pandemic; However, the event successfully returned for 2023. 
 Cornelia, Georgia: Cornelia hosts a "Little Red Apple" Drop and Dance in honor of the region's apple growers. The "Big Red Apple" located at the train depot is not dropped.
 Duluth, Georgia: A disco ball called the Soaring Spirit Ball is raised.
 Gainesville, Georgia: The "Chuck the Chicken" Drop started in 2009 to benefit the Humane Society of Northeast Georgia.
 Macon, Georgia: A 6-foot wide lighted ball with metal cherry blossoms and pink lights is dropped in honor of the International Cherry Blossom Festival.
 Marietta, Georgia: In October 2015, the Marietta city council approved a cube designed by students at Kennesaw State University to drop on New Year's Eve for Marietta's first ever New Year's Eve ball drop, but additional details were kept silent. During the countdown, an aerialist from the Proia Dance Project dropped from the cube and performed until a few minutes after midnight. The event confused many people in attendance.
 Perry, Georgia: A buzzard is lowered.
 Savannah, Georgia: Since 2014, the Savannah Riverfront has hosted Up the Cup on River Street, featuring the raising of a to-go cup.
 Tallapoosa, Georgia: A stuffed opossum named Spencer is lowered.
 Unadilla, Georgia: A hog is lowered at midnight.
 Winder, Georgia: A Jug Drop takes place at the Barrow County Museum.

Indiana
 Fort Wayne, Indiana: A ball is dropped as part of an event entitled The 'Fort Wayne New Year's Eve Ball Drop' which first started in 2016. The original drop was a projection which prompted a group of engineers to volunteer their time in creating an 8 ft. in diameter, low-poly ball covered in translucent acrylic plastic, and lit with over 380,000 lumens of LEDs. As of 2017, the ball is hoisted 80 feet over the corner of Baker and Ewing St., and lowered by crane as the New Year rings in.
 Indianapolis, Indiana: An Indy car will be dropped beginning in 2015.
 Kokomo, Indiana: An aluminum 70-pound Ball with 34,000 lights is dropped during The Kokomo Downtown Association New Year's Eve Celebration.
 Muncie, Indiana: A ball is dropped.
 Vincennes, Indiana (near Terre Haute): The giant 18-foot, 500-pound steel-and-foam Watermelon Ball is raised 100 feet in the air during the 60-second countdown at midnight, then the replica releases 11 real locally-grown watermelons.
Also see: Indiana - Central Time Zone

Maine
 Bangor, Maine: A beach ball covered in Christmas lights has been thrown off the top of a local restaurant since 2005.
 Eastport, Maine: A sardine is lowered in a nod to the area's history in the herring fishing and canning industry. In honor of the nearby Canadian town of Saint Andrews, New Brunswick (situated across Passamaquoddy Bay), a red maple leaf is also lowered for 11 p.m ET (midnight Atlantic Time). Both objects were created by sculptor Bill Schaefer of East Machias.
 Kennebunk, Maine: A wild blueberry ball has dropped from the town's First Parish Unitarian Universalist Church on Main Street since 2015.
 Machias, Maine: A giant plastic lobster, holding a shovel and blueberries is lowered. It took place at Pat's Pizza, during 2016.

Maryland
 Baltimore, Maryland: A disco ball is dropped.
 Berlin, Maryland: Starting in 2017, a ball will be lowered.
 Easton, Maryland: A red crab is dropped.
 Frederick, Maryland: A giant key is dropped above Carroll Creek.
 Havre de Grace, Maryland – An eight-foot long, five-foot high wood-and-plastic foam lit duck has been dropped since 2000.
 Ocean City, Maryland: An illuminated beach ball is dropped.
 Princess Anne, Maryland: A stuffed muskrat in a top hat and bow tie named Marshall P. Muskrat is dropped.
 Hagerstown, Maryland: A giant doughnut is dropped in honor of Krumpe's Do-Nuts, a family-owned bakery that has been in business since 1934.

Michigan
 Ann Arbor, Michigan: For 2014, a lit hockey puck was "dropped" in honor of the NHL Winter Classic game occurring on New Year's Day at Michigan Stadium.
 Detroit, Michigan: A sculpture known as the "D Burst" (which is adorned with a giant letter "D") is lowered at Campus Martius Park.
 Grand Rapids, Michigan: A six-foot diameter steel ball is dropped for the WZZM Ball Drop in Rosa Parks Circle. The ball was built by GLC Metal Fabricators Inc. in Ludington with help from Harsco, covered in LED lights done by Tye's Signs in Scottville. A crane raises the ball 160 feet into the air before lowering it slowly into its position for the countdown.
 Kalamazoo, Michigan: A recyclable ball has been dropped since 2009.
 Ludington, Michigan: A 6’ 5” diameter ball lit up with thousands of lights is lowered on a countdown to midnight.
 Marquette, Michigan: A lighted ball is dropped from the Masonic Center along Washington St.
 Royal Oak, Michigan: A ball is dropped at midnight.
 Traverse City, Michigan: A cherry is dropped at midnight; the events are televised on WMNN-LD.
 Wyandotte, Michigan: A 1,000 pound lit steel ball is dropped at both 9pm and midnight next to The Clock Tower downtown.

New Jersey

 Hammonton, New Jersey: A blueberry was dropped to commence the year 2018.
 Passaic, New Jersey: A 'Piñata Drop' tradition began in 2018 when a piñata was dropped from the city's tallest building at 663 Main Ave. The 11-foot-wide piñata piñata continues to be dropped every year in the presence of hundreds of attendees, live music, and food vendors.
 Point Pleasant, New Jersey: "The Millennium Mossbunker," a mossbunker fish, was dropped for the year 2000.
 Seaside Heights, New Jersey: Nicole Polizzi (Snooki) from MTV's Seaside Heights-based reality series Jersey Shore was lowered inside a "hamster ball" in 2011 for the network's New Year's Eve special. While the drop was originally to be held inside MTV's studios at Times Square alongside its more famous counterpart, city officials asked MTV not to do so.

New York

New York holds many elaborate drops, particularly the ball drop at Times Square and at the Electric Tower in Buffalo. The state comes in second in America for the most items dropped on New Year's Eve.
 Binghamton, New York: A 6-foot lighted ball is dropped.
 Brocton, New York: A 14' diameter ball is dropped from a height of 165' in front of the Saint Stephen's Hotel at the Arches in downtown Brockton. This is reportedly the highest & largest ball drop in the country & the second highest in the world, according to the Dunkirk Observer.
 Buffalo, New York: A lighted ball is dropped, at one time along with a Ford Edge automobile. The Buffalo Ball Drop (formerly the 97 Rock Ball Drop) is the second largest in the country, with 40,000 in attendance during a typical year. The Buffalo Ball Drop is held annually from the Electric Tower in Roosevelt Plaza. It was nearly canceled in 2010 (due mainly to the effects of the late 2000s recession) before a last-minute sponsorship drive brought in the necessary funds to successfully carry out the festivities. The event is broadcast on both 97 Rock (through the radio) and on ABC 7 Buffalo (on television), usually in split screen so that the viewers may see both the Times Square, and Electric Tower ball drops simultaneously.
 Cheektowaga, New York: A ball is dropped during the day on New Year's Eve to offer an alternative for families.
 Hamburg, New York: A ball is dropped. The ball drop was discontinued in 2018 because of dangerously cold temperatures.
 New York City (Times Square): In its current iteration since 2008–09, a  ball covered in Waterford Crystal panels has been lowered from the top of One Times Square. The Times Square Ball was originally made of wood and previously metal; during the 1980s, an illuminated apple was used in its place. The ball used to be lit by halogen lamps, but LED has been used since 2008. In 2009, an enlarged version of the new LED-equipped ball became a permanent fixture year-round atop One Times Square. Over a million spectators come to the square each year to see the drop.
 New York City (rotating locations, Greenwood Heights for 2011): A giant lighted ukulele, dropped by "Sonic Uke" (a local ukulele playing duo), has been dropped each year in a different location since 2004–05.
 Niagara Falls, New York: A ten-foot Gibson Guitar is dropped from a specially designed 120-foot scaffold at the stroke of midnight at the Hard Rock Cafe. It draws an anticipated crowd of 15,000 to 20,000.
 North Tonawanda, New York: A ball is dropped as part of New Year's on the Canal.
 Orchard Park, New York: A ball is dropped. The ball drop was discontinued in 2018 because of dangerously cold temperatures.
 Rochester, New York: A tree made out of kegs will be dropped to commence 2020.
 Syracuse, New York: An orange ball was dropped for 2013 and 2014; the event was canceled after that and replaced with a midsummer celebration.
 Watertown, New York: A beach ball is dropped at noon New Year's Eve, which kicks off the city's season-long winter celebration, Snowtown USA.
 White Plains, New York: A ball drops from a crane on the corner of Main Street and Renaissance Square in downtown. The urban festival attracts 25,000 residents of Westchester County, New York.
 Wilson, New York: Two balls are dropped, one at 9p.m. and the other at midnight.

North Carolina

 Beaufort, North Carolina: A pirate is dropped.
 Black Creek, North Carolina: A large red heart drop represents "A Small Town with a Big Heart".
 Brasstown, North Carolina: A plexiglas pyramid containing a living opossum is lowered from the roof of Clay Logan's convenience store for The Possum Drop. The possum is turned loose at the end of the celebration. Despite these measures, the event has been met with criticism from animal rights activists, particularly PETA, who has a history of objections to the event. The event resumed in 2014. After PETA protests, organizers announced in January 2018 they would be stepping down and retiring from organizing the event, saying that "it's a hard job to do" and "it's time to move on."
 Burgaw, North Carolina: A blueberry drops in reference to the town's annual blueberry festival.
 Eastover, North Carolina: A three-foot tall, thirty-pound wooden flea is dropped.
 Charlotte, North Carolina: A lighted crown is raised, representing Charlotte's nickname as "The Queen City". Charlotte Center City Partners produces the festivities.
 Marion, North Carolina: A five-foot tall illuminated gold nugget drops into a large doughnut. The event is hosted by the Marion Rotary Club with support and sponsorship from many local organizations and businesses.
 Morehead City, North Carolina: A "kids' crab pot drop" is lowered at 6:00 p.m. local time during December 31, 2017.
 Mount Olive, North Carolina: The New Year's Eve Pickle is lowered down the Mt. Olive Pickle Company flagpole at 7pm EST, midnight Greenwich Mean Time.
 Raleigh, North Carolina: A 900-pound copper-and-steel acorn, designed by sculptor David Benson to celebrate the city's 1992 Bicentennial and Raleigh's nickname, “The City of Oaks”, is lowered by a crane. The event has since become one of the busiest New Year's celebrations in the United States with roughly 40,000 attending each year and an attendance record of 80,000 set in 2012.
 In years when the Carolina Hurricanes play at home on New Year's Eve, PNC Arena holds its own New Year's Eve "puck drop" inside the arena for fans that attend the game.

Ohio
 Chagrin Falls, Ohio: A ball of popcorn is dropped.
 Cincinnati, Ohio: A flying pig is "flown", not dropped, confirming there is at least one occasion "when pigs fly".
 Elmore, Ohio: A sausage is dropped.
 Marion, Ohio: In the home of the annual Marion Popcorn Festival and the home of the Wyandot Popcorn Company, a giant ball of popcorn is dropped.
 New Carlisle, Ohio: A 7.5-foot, 200-pound aluminum ball is lowered by 90 feet at midnight.
 Port Clinton, Ohio: A walleye fish named "Captain Wylie Walleye" is dropped.
 Yellow Springs, Ohio: A ball is dropped.

Ontario
 Niagara Falls, Ontario: The elevator of the Skylon Tower is raised. The event, and an associated concert, was televised by Global through the 2015 celebration, then by the CBC in 2020. The event drew 65,000 spectators for the 2013 celebration, which was headlined by Dragonette, Hedley, and Nelly Furtado.

Pennsylvania
Pennsylvania is the state where the most objects are dropped on New Year's Eve.
 Allentown, Pennsylvania: Allentown's own liberty bell is dropped to commemorate the period when the Liberty Bell was stored in Allentown during the American Revolution.
 Akron, Pennsylvania: A purple-and-gold shoe is dropped.
 Beavertown, Pennsylvania: A stuffed beaver is dropped.
 Bethlehem, Pennsylvania: A 100-pound yellow illuminated Peep made out of fiberglass. (The producer of Peeps, Just Born, is based in Bethlehem)
 Blain, Pennsylvania: A wooden cow is dropped from a silo.
 Boyertown, Pennsylvania: A bear has been dropped since 2010.
 Bradford, Pennsylvania: A model gazebo has been dropped since 2019; previous to that, a ball had been dropped on an irregular basis.
 Burnham, Pennsylvania: Starting in 2018, a replica railroad wheel was dropped honoring Standard Steel LLC, which has operated for over 200 years.
 Carlisle, Pennsylvania: A button is dropped.
 Cleona, Pennsylvania: A pretzel is raised.
 Cornwall, Pennsylvania: A Cannonball Drop commemorates the historic Cornwall Iron Furnace. The Civil War-era bowling-ball-sized cannonball is courtesy of Sgt. Damian Smith, command historian for the Pennsylvania National Guard.
 Dillsburg, Pennsylvania: Two pickles are dropped; the "Lil' Dill" at 7:00 p.m. ET (midnight in Ireland, in celebration of Dillsburg's Irish founders), and "Mr. Pickle" at midnight. This practice was canceled in 2017-18 due to dangerously cold temperatures, but subsequently brought back for 2018–19.
 Drexel Hill, Pennsylvania: Starting in 2017, a "fire truck" ball will be lowered.
 Duncannon, Pennsylvania: A sled is dropped.
 East Petersburg, Pennsylvania: A large "Haydn's Jug" is dropped.
 Easton, Pennsylvania: A ten-foot Crayola crayon is dropped at 8pm to accommodate children's bedtimes
 Elizabethtown, Pennsylvania: A giant M&M is dropped at midnight UTC to correspond with midnight in sister city Letterkenny in Ireland. This changed to a Dove chocolate bar in 2012–13; both Dove and M&M's are manufactured in Elizabethtown.
 Falmouth, Pennsylvania: A stuffed goat is dropped.
 Halifax, Pennsylvania: A Hemlock tree is dropped.
 Hallam, Pennsylvania: A replica of the Haines Shoe House is dropped.
 Harrisburg, Pennsylvania: A strawberry is dropped.
 Hanover, Pennsylvania: A Three Foot Pac-Man is Dropped at Midnight 
 Hershey, Pennsylvania: A Hershey Kiss replica is raised.
 Highspire, Pennsylvania: Highspire drops candy in commemoration of the Knights Candy Store that operated there during the 1950s to 1970s.
 Hummelstown, Pennsylvania: A lollipop is dropped. 
 Ickesburg, Pennsylvania: A french fry is dropped.'
 Kennett Square, Pennsylvania: For 2014, a steel mushroom was dropped. Kennett Square, often called "The Mushroom Capital of the World", is one of the largest growers of mushrooms.
 Lancaster, Pennsylvania: A red rose is dropped.

 Lebanon, Pennsylvania: A 100-pound stick of Lebanon Bologna is dropped. The bologna itself is distributed to a local food bank and animal shelter following the drop. For the 2016-2017 this has been modified to ten 20 sticks.
 Lewistown, Pennsylvania: A bag of Hartley's potato chips is dropped.
 Lisburn, Pennsylvania: A pair of yellow pants or "britches" is dropped in honor of the Yellow Breeches Creek.
 Lititz, Pennsylvania: A Moravian star is raised.
 Liverpool, Pennsylvania: A canal boat is dropped.
 Marysville, Pennsylvania: A replica of the Rockville Bridge that was made my a local Cub Scout Pack is being dropped 
 Media, Pennsylvania: A ball is dropped.
 Manheim, Pennsylvania: A ball is raised.
 McClure, Pennsylvania: A kettle is dropped in honor of McClure Bean Soup Festival.
 McVeytown, Pennsylvania: An ice cream cake is dropped.
 Mechanicsburg, Pennsylvania: A wrench is dropped.
 Middletown, Pennsylvania: A metal Rhombicuboctahedron, referred to by the organizers as a "sphoctagon" (portmanteau of sphere and octagon), is dropped.
 Myerstown, Pennsylvania: A tablet of Bayer aspirin has been dropped since 2013–14; Bayer operates a manufacturing plant in Myerstown.
 New Bloomfield, Pennsylvania: A box huckleberry is dropped.
 Newville, Pennsylvania: A big spring is dropped.
 Palmyra, Pennsylvania: "The Giant Shoe" is dropped.
 Pittsburgh, Pennsylvania: A ball representing the planet earth, made of recycled materials, was raised for 2007.
 Plains Township, Pennsylvania: , for 2023, a replica brick is dropped.
 Port Royal, Pennsylvania: A sprint car is dropped.
 Pottsville, Pennsylvania: A bottle of Yuengling beer is raised.
 Reamstown, Pennsylvania: "Wobbly Bob" on a beer barrel is dropped.
 Red Lion, Pennsylvania: A wooden cigar held by a lion is raised.
 Richland, Pennsylvania: A cigar is dropped.
 Shamokin, Pennsylvania: A chunk of coal is dropped, turning into a diamond at the bottom; the event has been held since 1987–88.
 Shenandoah, Pennsylvania: A giant pierogi with kielbasi is dropped at 7:00pm, during 2017.
 Shippensburg, Pennsylvania: An anchor is dropped.
 Strasburg, Pennsylvania: Ping pong balls are dropped.
 Sunbury, Pennsylvania: An incandescent lamp is lit as an homage to the Hotel Edison and its namesake, Thomas Edison.
 Tamaqua, Pennsylvania: A group of eagles are raised at The ABC Tamaqua Hi-Rise.
 Wilkes-Barre, Pennsylvania: A chunk of coal is dropped, turning into a diamond at the bottom. The Wilkes-Barre celebration, which began in 1995–96, is an homage to the one in Shamokin.
 Womelsdorf, Pennsylvania: A cigar is dropped, an event that began in 2012.
 York, Pennsylvania: A white rose is dropped at midnight after a children's countdown from 6 to 8pm.

South Carolina
 Hilton Head Island, South Carolina: A giant, lighted golf ball is lowered from the Harbour Town Lighthouse, in honor of the Sea Pines Resort's golf courses (which include Harbour Town Golf Links, host of the PGA Tour's RBC Heritage tournament).
 Folly Beach, South Carolina: A giant pair of flip flops are dropped at the end of Center Street, which draws a crowd. It was started in 2010/2011.

Tennessee (Eastern)
 Gatlinburg, Tennessee: A ball is dropped.
 Knoxville, Tennessee: A ball is dropped on Market Square.

Virginia
 Richmond, Virginia: A copy of the Times Square Ball is raised rather than dropped, on the Byrd Theater in Carytown.
 Roanoke, Virginia: A 10-foot illuminated star is dropped.
 Charlottesville, Virginia: A ball is dropped.
 Fredericksburg, Virginia: An illuminated pear is dropped.
 South Hill, Virginia A 6-foot tall illuminated Star is dropped from 80-foot tall flag pole in the center of town at the Farmer's Market Square.
 Chincoteague, Virginia: The Pony Island Horseshoe Drop, on the Downtown Waterfront Park in Chincoteague, Virginia.

US Central Time Zone

Alabama
 Mobile, Alabama: A 600-pound, lit Moon Pie is lowered from the RSA Tower in the "MoonPie Over Mobile" festivities sponsored by Chattanooga Bakery. The drop is televised locally by WKRG-TV and syndicated to Alabama television stations owned by Raycom Media (who is headquartered in the tower). Festivities also include a Mardi Gras-styled parade, as moon pies are a traditional "throw" at Mardi Gras events in Mobile.
 Fairhope, Alabama: A ball is dropped. The event was cancelled in 2010, but resumed in time to ring in 2011.
 Wetumpka, Alabama: A meteorite is dropped at the Old Courthouse at 11pm Central Time in honor of the meteorite that hit the River City. At the stroke of midnight, a big fireworks display takes place over the river.
 Dothan, Alabama: Nicknamed "The Peanut Capital of the World", this city has an annual "Peanut Drop". The Peanut Drop consisted of a giant peanut shaped balloon bag (not to be mistaken as a massive phallus) that has also drawn controversial attention to news organizations around the word such as Russia Today

Arkansas
 Fayetteville, Arkansas: A hog is dropped.
 Fort Smith, Arkansas: KISR sponsors a ball drop.

Florida Panhandle
 Destin, Florida: A ball is pulled over Destin Harbor.
 Fort Walton Beach, Florida: A ball is dropped.
 Panama City, Florida: An illuminated, 800-pound beach ball descends from a tower 12 stories high at midnight. At 8:30pm there is a fireworks celebration and a "family ball drop" with 7,000 beach balls.
 Pensacola, Florida: A pelican is dropped.

Illinois
 Chicago, Illinois: A star was (formerly) raised.
 Des Plaines, Illinois: A diamond is dropped.
 Rockford, Illinois: A ball is lowered towards the Discovery Center building.

Indiana (Northwest & Southwest)
 Hammond / Whiting, Indiana (Outside Chicago):  A 10-foot Illuminated Pierogi will be lowered 90 feet during a countdown to Midnight. The Pierogi Drop is sponsored by Knights of Columbus Council 1696 and has been occurring since 2016.  Whiting is known for the annual Pierogi Fest which occurs the last weekend of July.
Tell City, Indiana: An apple with an arrow through it (symbolizing Tell City's namesake, William Tell) is dropped at City Hall Park.

Iowa
 Cedar Falls, Iowa: A large cedar is lowered by a chain.

Kansas
 Manhattan, Kansas: "The Little Apple", an apple-shaped aluminum ball (a replica of the 1980s era Times Square Ball), is dropped, with the events televised by WIBW-TV in Topeka until 2013–14.

Louisiana
 New Orleans, Louisiana: A fleur-de-lis is lowered at Jackson Square. Until 2008, a gumbo pot was dropped. Since 2017, the television special Dick Clark's New Year's Rockin' Eve has televised the drop and concert acts from the city as part of a Central Time segment of the special.

Mississippi
 Columbus: An illuminated 10-foot wide by 10-foot tall lit aluminum ball is hoisted over College Street 100 feet high as part of the "Having a Ball Downtown Block Party". Festivities are broadcast live on WCBI. No longer airs!
Hattiesburg: A replica of the original "Hub-Sign" is lowered in Hattiesburg's historic downtown district. The original 4-story "Hub-Sign" stood atop a downtown building for 35 years (1912- c.1947) and served as a symbol of Hattiesburg's heritage as the hub of the Gulf-South.
Jackson: , Jackson drops a magnolia.

Missouri
 Kansas City, Missouri: Michael "The Doughboy" Maslak, the longest-tenured improviser at the ComedyCity improv theater, is draped in lights and dropped by members of the troupe.

Oklahoma
 Bartlesville, Oklahoma: An olive is dropped.
 Oklahoma City: A lighted ball is raised during Opening Night.
 Tulsa: The Tulsa Ball Drop, held annually in Brookside, a district famous for its nightlife, features live music, performances, and a street party.

Tennessee (Central and Western)
 Memphis, Tennessee: A mirrored ball is raised since 2020; previous to that, guitar is dropped.
 Nashville, Tennessee: An 80-foot Guitar Drop took place at Nashville's Hard Rock Cafe during Music City's Bash On Broadway. In 2011 the partnership ended with Hard Rock Cafe and the guitar was replaced by a 15-foot-tall music note.

Texas
 Austin, Texas: Families in the Austin Woods neighborhood traditionally celebrate the new year with large illuminated new year's balls hung from trees, which are lowered at varying times during New Year's Eve. Downtown, a Lone Star was dropped until 2006, then replaced with a simple mirrored ball.
 Houston, Texas: A star representing the Lone Star State was raised at midnight. No celebration was held in 2019. There is also a Noon Ball Drop at the Children's Museum of Houston for families to celebrate New Year's Noon.
 McAllen, Texas: A giant mirrored ball descends just before midnight. The first orb for 2008 was six feet in diameter, but in 2009 McAllen's big bash was expanded to include a bigger crowd (10,000 attended), a bigger party space and the bigger "Texas-sized" ball used until 2014. This event was last staged in 2014-15 and the event was axed in 2015 due to budgetary problems. An attempt was made to resurrect the event for 2017–18, but failed because of a lack of permit.
 San Antonio, Texas: The elevator on the Tower of the Americas is raised.

Wisconsin
 Plymouth, Wisconsin: Plymouth drops an 80-pound decorated cheese wedge, the newest Wisconsin cheese, from a 100 ft. ladder truck in a tribute to the region's dairy industry and dairy products. The Plymouth Arts Center hosts the annual “Build Your Own New Year’s Party” next to the Creamery Building's parking lot where "The Big Cheese Drop" takes place.
 Prairie du Chien, Wisconsin: A carp (real but dead) caught by local fishers and weighing between 25 and 30 pounds is lowered. A carp was chosen to represent the area's fishing industry and because the carp is considered one of the luckiest fish in Chinese culture. The carp, nicknamed “Lucky”, is lowered onto a throne. Each “Lucky” has a tree planted where it is buried with a commemorative plaque listing the carp's name and year.
 Sister Bay, Wisconsin: A cherry-shaped ball is lowered at midnight.

US Mountain Time Zone

Arizona

 Flagstaff, Arizona: A pine cone is dropped from the balcony of Weatherford hotel.
 Tempe, Arizona: An illuminated sunburst was dropped while the Fiesta Bowl Block Party and Parade was sponsored by Sunkist, but replaced by a Giant Tortilla Chip when Tostitos Tortilla Chips took over the sponsorship from Sunkist. The party is 10 blocks long and four blocks wide with two fireworks shows (10p.m. and midnight).
 Show Low, Arizona: A deuce of clubs (2♣) debuted in 2011–12. The card, which is the namesake of the main road through Show Low, is, according to legend the origin of the town's name (the town's founders allegedly derived the name "show low" from a game of poker where the winner showed a 2♣, the lowest card in the deck).
 Tucson, Arizona: Starting in 2014, a large replica Taco was dropped from the roof of the Hotel Congress
 Prescott, Arizona: A boot has been dropped since 2010–2011.
 Yuma, Arizona: In 2018, the city introduced the "Iceberg Drop", lowering a giant, illuminated lettuce. Two drops are held, with one at 10:00 p.m. MT to mark the arrival of the new year in the Eastern Time Zone, and a second at midnight local time.

Idaho
 Boise, Idaho: Since 2014, a giant potato was dropped from the US Bank building in downtown Boise. For 2016, the drop moved to the Idaho State Capitol building, and the organizers successfully crowdfunded a new "Glowtato" with internal lighting. KTVB televises the festivities most years.
 Emmett, Idaho: Since 2016, a cherry has been raised.
 Twin Falls, Idaho: Since 2002, a metal ball, bought at auction for $14 by Dave Woodhead—owner of the former bar Woody's, has been dropped from a pair of grain elevators. The low-budget event attracted a cult following: later editions also switched from a manual pulley to using a 1961 Ford Econoline truck to lower the ball. Following the lease of the bar to new owners, the event was placed on hiatus for 2014, but returned for 2015 in partnership with the new owners. Woodhead acknowledged the drop's inclusion on lists of New Year's Eve drops on Mental Floss and Wikipedia as a sign of notoriety for the event.

New Mexico
 Las Cruces, New Mexico: A 19-foot illuminated chrome chili pepper is dropped.
Santa Fe, New Mexico: Since 2015, a Zia symbol has been raised 60 feet into the air over Santa Fe Plaza. Sponsored by the City of Santa Fe, the Kiwanis Club of Santa Fe, and other local organizations and businesses, the raising of the Zia is accompanied by live music, food and drinks, fireworks, and bonfires.

Wyoming
 Cheyenne, Wyoming: Drops a ball at Midnight.

Philippine Standard Time

National Capital Region
 Quezon City, Philippines: A star is dropped at Eastwood City.

US Pacific Time Zone

California

 Orange County, California: An orange is dropped at Disneyland.
 Sacramento, California: A diamond-shaped ball was dropped in 2009, but this was discontinued in 2010. A proposal to revive the ball drop for 2013 was rejected.
 South Lake Tahoe, California: A gondola is lowered at midnight Eastern Time.
 Temecula, California: A bunch of grapes are dropped.

Nevada 

 In 2020, The Strat in Las Vegas announced that it would lower the winner of a contest, dressed in a disco ball-inspired outfit, at midnight to welcome 2021 via its SkyJump Las Vegas ride. It is normally closed on New Year's Eve due to the tower's participation in the America's Party fireworks across the Las Vegas Strip (cancelled due to the COVID-19 pandemic).

Oregon 

La Grande, Oregon: Since 2015, a lighted ball has been lowered atop the John Howard Building in downtown La Grande, accompanied by a larger block party.

Washington 
Seattle, Washington: The elevator of the Space Needle is raised.
Toledo, Washington: A Giant Cheese Ball is dropped.

See also
 List of Christmas parades
 First Night

References

External links
 http://www.newyearfestival.com
 http://www.syddware.com/balldrop.html

New Years Eve Objects Dropped
New Year's television specials
New Years Eve Objects Dropped
New Years Eve Objects Dropped
New Years Eve Objects Dropped